
Gmina Żerków is an urban-rural gmina (administrative district) in Jarocin County, Greater Poland Voivodeship, in west-central Poland.

Villages
Apart from the town of Żerków, Gmina Żerków contains the villages and settlements of Antonin, Bieździadów, Brzóstków, Chrzan, Chwałów, Dobieszczyzna, Gąsiorów, Gęczew, Kamień, Komorze Przybysławskie, Kretków, Laski, Lgów, Lisew, Lubinia Mała, Ludwinów, Miniszew, Paruchów, Parzewnia, Pawłowice, Podlesie, Pogorzelica, Prusinów, Przybysław, Raszewy, Rogaszyce, Rozmarynów, Siekierzyn, Sierszew, Śmiełów, Stęgosz, Sucha, Szczonów, Żerniki and Żółków.

Neighbouring gminas
Gmina Żerków is bordered by the gminas of Czermin, Gizałki, Jarocin, Kołaczkowo, Kotlin, Miłosław, Nowe Miasto nad Wartą and Pyzdry.

References
Polish official population figures 2006

Zerkow
Jarocin County